R'nkovce is a village in the municipality of Lipkovo, North Macedonia.

Demographics
As of the 2021 census, R'nkovce had zero residents.

According to the 2002 census, the village had a total of 21 inhabitants. Ethnic groups in the village include:

Albanians 21

References

External links

Villages in Lipkovo Municipality
Albanian communities in North Macedonia